The women's eight-ball singles tournament at the 2010 Asian Games in Guangzhou took place from 14 November to 18 November at Asian Games Town Gymnasium.

Schedule
All times are China Standard Time (UTC+08:00)

Results
Legend
WO — Won by walkover

Final

Top half

Bottom half

References 
Results
Draw

External links 
 Cue Sports results at the official site of 2010 Asian Games 

Cue sports at the 2010 Asian Games